David Pedrosa Guerreiro (born 22 March 1993 in Luanda), known as Peixinho, is a Portuguese professional footballer who plays as a defensive midfielder.

References

External links

1993 births
Living people
Portuguese sportspeople of Angolan descent
Footballers from Luanda
Portuguese footballers
Association football midfielders
Liga Portugal 2 players
Segunda Divisão players
Vitória F.C. players
Casa Pia A.C. players
S.C. Farense players
C.D. Mafra players
C.D. Pinhalnovense players